Calgary-Nose Hill was a provincial electoral district in Calgary, Alberta, Canada, mandated to return a single member to the Legislative Assembly of Alberta using the first past the post method of voting from 2004 to 2012.

Calgary-Nose Hill history
The Calgary-Nose Hill electoral district was created in the 2003 electoral boundary re-distribution from portions of Calgary-Foothills, Calgary-North Hill and Calgary-Nose Creek electoral districts. The riding was named after Nose Hill Park in Calgary.

The Calgary-Nose Hill electoral district would be dissolved in the 2010 Alberta boundary re-distribution and would be re-distributed into the Calgary-Mackay-Nose Hill electoral district.

Boundary history

Electoral history
The electoral district was created from parts of three different riding's in the 2004 boundary redistribution. The first election held in 2004 saw Progressive Conservative candidate Neil Brown pickup the district with under half of the popular vote. He defeated a field of four other candidates.

Brown stood for re-election against four other candidates in the 2008 general election. He was returned to power with a slight increase in his popular vote but still won under 50%.

Election results

2004 general election

2008 general election

Senate election results

2004 Senate nominee election district results

Voters had the option of selecting 4 candidates on the ballot.

2004 student vote

On November 19, 2004, a student vote was conducted at participating Alberta schools to parallel the 2004 Alberta general election results. The vote was designed to educate students and simulate the electoral process for persons who had not yet reached the legal majority. The vote was conducted in 80 of the 83 provincial electoral districts, with students voting for actual election candidates. Schools with a large student body who resided in another electoral district had the option to vote for candidates outside of the electoral district than where they were physically located.

See also
List of Alberta provincial electoral districts

References

Further reading

External links
Elections Alberta
The Legislative Assembly of Alberta
Electoral Divisions Act, SA 2003, c E-4.1 on CanLII

Former provincial electoral districts of Alberta
Politics of Calgary